Parascaptia biplagata is a moth of the subfamily Arctiinae. It was described by George Thomas Bethune-Baker in 1908. It is found in Papua New Guinea and Australia.

References

Moths described in 1908
Lithosiini